Gangadhwaj Govardhan was the 20th king of medieval Sylhet's Gour Kingdom.

Reign

Govardhan rose to power following the death of his father, Gouradhwaj Bhabananda. During this period, Raja Upananda was the King of Brahmachal (Southern Sylhet). The long-lasted conflict between the north and south continued during Govardhan's reign. Govardhan appointed his chief minister, Madan Rai, to somehow find a way to lure Upananda's general, Amar Singh, in order to use him in infiltrating the south. Govardhan and Madan Rai then made an agreement with Govardhan's general Virabhadra to give his daughter, Chandra Kala, in marriage to Singh. The marriage was successful, despite protests, and Singh maintained a good relationship with General Virabhadra.

Singh also had a friendship with the Kuki Chiefs, the border guards for the Tripura Kingdom, just south of Brahmachal. The Kuki Chiefs were persuaded into raiding Raja Upananda's palace in the dead of the night, massacring most of its inmates. As another battle emerged, a few children of the royal family managed to escape. Babysat by the Upananda's older sister-in-law, Anna Purna, the children reached the jungles where a Bihari sannyasi by the name of Giridhari took guided them to Kamakhya Temple where they were trained into hermitage.

The battle hosted casualties on both sides leading to the death of Raja Upananda. General Amar Singh took over Brahmachal for a short while before also being killed. The Kuki Chiefs annexed Brahmachal (modern-day Baramchal in Kulaura) to the King of Tripura and Govardhan sent Jaidev Rai, son of Upananda's minister, to be a feudal ruler under the Tripuras. In fear of Kuki Chiefs, the Raja Shandul of Taraf migrated to Gour and the King of Tripura put Bhadra Janardhan in charge of Taraf.

During a hunting expedition in the Patharia hills, Govardhan wished to establish a resting place for the benefit of travellers. He came across a monk by the name of Madhabeshwar meditating under a waterfall. In respect of the monk, the waterfall was called Madhabkunda waterfall.

Defeat
Although Govardhan's early rule of Gour maintained a healthy relationship with Tripura, the latter part of his reign had to deal with rebels. The Jaintia Kingdom, north of Gour, attempted to invade and annex Gour to its kingdom. The various indigenous tribes including the Pnar, the Khasis, the Kacharis, the Kukis and the Nagas joined forces in attacking Bengali-dominated Gour. Gour was being attacked from both directions and had no support from neighbouring states. Govardhan was killed in battle. However, the royal men of Brahmachal who had migrated to Kamakhya in the start of Govardhan's rule, had returned to Gour being led by Upananda's nephew, Gour Govinda, who would defeat the rebels and re-establish peace with the Tripura Kingdom.

Descendants
Other than Garuda of Gour, it is said that Govardhan had another son called Prem Narayan. The zamindars of Selbaras, who are described as one of the most prominent zamindars of greater Sylhet, are descended from Prem Narayan's son Radhaballabh. Radhaballabh embraced Sunni Islam in 1662, adopting the name Muhammad Zaman Mia Mayman. He later married the daughter of Mir Jumla, and they had a son called Muhammad Shamsher. Radhaballabh's grandson was Muhammad Darvesh, who had a son named Muhammad Basher, who had a son named Muhammad Hazer. Hazer was succeeded by his son Muhammad Haydar, whose son was Muhammad Qamar, whose son was Ghulam Rabib. Ghulam Rabib's son, Zamindar Ghulam Jilani Choudhury, married Ashrafunnesa Choudhurani and they had a son named Ahmad Taufiq Choudhury (d. 2005). The latter left Sunni Islam for the Ahmadiyya movement where he became the regional leader of Khuddam-ul Ahmadiyya, and later migrated to Mymensingh where he became the Ameer of Ahmadiyya Muslim Jamaat Bangladesh after independence.

Another descendant of Govardhan, Muhammad Akhtar Chowdhury Tota Mia (b. 1840s) was a powerful zamindar of Selbaras of his time and renowned for his bravery across Sunamganj and Mymensingh. Narrative folk ballads, known as pala gan, about Tota Mia's heroism gained prominence. These ballads are preserved in Badiuzzaman's Momenshahi Geetika published by Bangla Academy.

References

Rulers of Sylhet
13th-century Indian monarchs